NHCT may refer to:
Na (sodium) - K (potassium) cotransporter. See: Sodium-proton antiporter
Non-contrast helical CT. See computed tomography